Sarykol is a district of Kostanay Region in northern Kazakhstan. The administrative center of the district is the urban-type settlement of Sarykol. Population:

References

Districts of Kazakhstan
Kostanay Region